The 2008 National Invitation Tournament (known through sponsorship as the MasterCard NIT) was a single-elimination tournament of 32 National Collegiate Athletic Association (NCAA) Division I teams that did not participate in the 2008 NCAA Division I men's basketball tournament.  The 71st annual tournament began on March 18 on campus sites and ended on April 3 at Madison Square Garden in New York City.  Each regular season conference champion that did not receive a bid to the NCAA Tournament received an automatic bid to this tournament.  The remaining slots were filled by the NIT Selection Committee. The first, second, and third rounds were played on the higher seeded team's home court, with the semi-finals and finals played at Madison Square Garden.

The Ohio State Buckeyes won the tournament.

Selection Committee
The 2008 NIT Selection Committee consists of the following former college basketball coaches and administrators:
 Rudy Davalos
 Don DeVoe
 Gene Keady
 Reggie Minton
 C. M. Newton (Chair)
 John J. Powers
 Carroll Williams

Participants

Automatic qualifiers
The following teams were automatic qualifiers for the 2008 NIT field after losing in their respective conference tournaments; by virtue of winning their conferences' regular season championship and not qualifying for the NCAA tournament.

Seedings

Bracket

Semifinals and Final
Played at Madison Square Garden in New York City on April 1 and 3

* - Overtime game.

See also
 2008 Women's National Invitation Tournament
 2008 NCAA Division I men's basketball tournament
 2008 NCAA Division II men's basketball tournament
 2008 NCAA Division III men's basketball tournament
 2008 NCAA Division I women's basketball tournament
 2008 NCAA Division II women's basketball tournament
 2008 NCAA Division III women's basketball tournament
 2008 NAIA Division I men's basketball tournament
 2008 NAIA Division II men's basketball tournament
 2008 NAIA Division I women's basketball tournament
 2008 NAIA Division II women's basketball tournament
 2008 College Basketball Invitational

References

National Invitation
National Invitation Tournament
2000s in Manhattan
National Invitation Tournament
Basketball in New York City
College sports in New York City
Madison Square Garden
National Invitation Tournament
National Invitation Tournament
Sports competitions in New York City
Sports in Manhattan